Indian by-elections for the Vidhan Sabha constituency Damoh were held on 17 April 2021.

Election results

2021 Vidhan Sabha

References 

2021 elections in India
By-elections in India